Siparia is a region of Trinidad and Tobago in the southwestern portion of the island. The Region of Siparia is a Regional Corporation, which handles local government functions.  The Siparia Regional Corporation is headquartered in Siparia.  Other urban areas include Cedros, Fyzabad, La Brea, Santa Flora, South Oropouche.

On Thursday 19 November 2020, while addressing the public on the re-opening of the Diego Martin South Community Centre, Prime Minister and MP for Diego Martin West Dr Keith Rowley announced that Siparia, along with Diego Martin, will be elevated to borough status in 2021.

Areas
 South Oropouche
 Cedros
 Siparia
 Santa Flora
 Fyzabad
 Erin
 La Brea
 Dow Village

Demographics

Ancestry

See also
 Point Fortin

References

Regions of Trinidad and Tobago
Trinidad (island)